John Forde (born 30 September 2001) is an Irish rugby union player. He plays in the back-row or as a lock and represents Cork Constitution in the amateur All-Ireland League.

Munster
Forde attended Presentation Brothers College and represented the school in the Munster Schools Rugby Senior Cup, featuring in the same back-row as Munster academy member and Ireland under-20s captain Alex Kendellen. Following the disruption caused by the province's recent tour to South Africa, Forde was registered with Munster's Champions Cup squad, and made his senior competitive debut for Munster in their opening 2021–22 Champions Cup fixture away to English club Wasps on 12 December 2021, coming on as a replacement for Eoin O'Connor in the province's 35–14 win.

References

External links

2001 births
Living people
People educated at Presentation Brothers College, Cork
Rugby union players from County Cork
Irish rugby union players
Cork Constitution players
Munster Rugby players
Rugby union flankers
Rugby union number eights
Rugby union locks